This is a list of Studio 100 productions, including its subsidiaries Studio 100 Animation, Flying Bark Productions, Little Airplane Productions and DED's IT Productions. Productions that were produced before the acquisition by Studio 100 are not included in this list, although the content belongs to the Studio 100 library.

Movies

Released

Upcoming

Series

Musicals

References

Dutch-language television networks
Television channels and stations established in 1996
Lists of television shows